Liboměřice is a municipality and village in Chrudim District in the Pardubice Region of the Czech Republic. It has about 200 inhabitants.

Administrative parts
Villages of Nové Lhotice, Pohořalka and Samařov are administrative parts of Liboměřice.

References

External links

Villages in Chrudim District